Chungliang “Al” Huang is a notable philosopher, dancer, performing artist, and internationally acclaimed taijiquan master and educator, having received the Republic of China’s most prestigious award in the field of education, the Gold Medal Award, from its Ministry of Education.

As the Keynote speaker at the Major World Gatherings in India, Switzerland, Germany, and Bali, Chungliang "Al" Huang appeared with many notable world leaders of religion and spiritual philosophy including the Dalai Lama.

Huang is the founder-president of the Living Tao Foundation based on the Oregon Coast of the United States, and the International Lan Ting Institute, located in the sacred mountains of China.

Huang was featured in the inaugural segment of Bill Moyers’ renowned PBS series A World of Ideas (1988, 1990).

Throughout his career, Huang established many close alliances with highly regarded philosophers and scholars of our time. Notably, his colleague and collaborator, the late philosopher scholar Alan Watts, mythologist Joseph Campbell, and his mentor John Blofeld.

Biography
Huang was born in Shanghai in the 1930s. His family moved to Taiwan at the end of the Chinese civil war. He grew up with a rich background in the classics, fine and martial arts, and the Beijing Opera techniques and moved to the United States in the 1960s to study Architecture, Cultural Anthropology, and Choreography.

Huang became a taijiquan teacher at the encouragement of Alan Watts, and became involved with the Human Potential Movement. His 1973 book Embrace Tiger, Return to Mountain greatly helped to popularize taijiquan in the West. It went on to be published in 14 languages.

Teaching and collaborations
He has taught at Esalen Institute in Big Sur, CA since the late 1960s.  Huang was a close colleague and collaborator with the late scholar Alan Watts, mythologist Joseph Campbell, Gregory Bateson, Laura Archera Huxley, John Blofeld, and Huston Smith.

Philosopher
Huang is well known for his collaborations with philosopher Alan Watts, Joseph Campbell and others for his involvement with Esalen Institute and the Omega Institute. He also appeared on the Bill Moyers series "A World of Ideas" on PBS. He now is the creator and president of the Living Tao Foundation and the Lan Ting Institute, which helps promote Chinese arts.

Concerts, performing arts and dance collaborations

Huang entered the performance arena through the entertainment business and gained recognition as a dancer with the original Rat Pack with Sammy Davis Jr., performing with Bruce Lee, and as a featured dancer in the film, Flower Drum Song.

Huang was soloist with his own theater/dance company performing at Jacob's Pillow, in New York City and at the American Dance Festival.

In the early 1980s, Huang co-created with Paul Winter Consort “The Tao of Bach: A Tai Ji Musical Offering” concert series at The Cathedral Church of St. John the Divine in New York City and at Grace Cathedral in San Francisco.

Collaborators in the past have included entertainer Sammy Davis, Jr., pianists Lorin Hollander and Robert Levin, flutists Alexander Murray, Michael Faust, Lorna McGhee; trumpeter Guy Few; Jazz musician, Paul Horn, Charles Lloyd; cellists David Darling and Michael Fitzpatrick; singers John Denver, Joan Baez; and harpist Andreas Vollenweider.

Educator
Huang is a respected speaker in the field of human potentiality, on cultural diversity and creative dynamism in global business and education. Huang’s unique style of teaching individuals to fulfill their human potential has garnered accolades and nurtured students of life around the world. This enlivened body of knowledge/wisdom, accumulated and crystallized into gems of structured guiding forces for nearly four decades, are transmitted to those who truly wish to gain this knowledge, wisdom, and expertise in order to become Living Tao Practitioners – perpetual students of lifelong learning who have been, and will become mentors to others.

Scholarship and notable recognitions
 Doctoral Research Scholar: Academia Sinica, Republic of China
 Fellow: World Academy of Art and Science, Stockholm, Sweden 
 Artist-in-residence: Krannert Center for the Performing Arts, Illinois, USA
 Director:  Oriental Theater Program, York University, Toronto, Canada
 Director: Hong Kong Dance Company
 Keynote speaker, at major world gatherings in India, Switzerland, Germany, Bali
 Assembly member: Cape Town, South Africa, and Barcelona, Spain,  The Council for a Parliament of the World's Religions

Music and dance residencies
 Yehudi Menuhim School, England
 Kuhmo Chamber Music Festival, Finland
 Oregon Bach Festival

Awards
 New speaker Award – Young Presidents’ Organization
 New Dimension Broadcaster Award
 Gold Medal – Ministry of Education of the Republic of China.

Publications
 Embrace Tiger Return to Mountain: The Essence of Taiji in co-operation with John O. "Steve" Stevens (now: Steve Andreas), with a preface by Stevens and his mother Barry Stevens (Real People Press, 1973)
 Tao: The Watercourse Way with Alan Watts (1975) 
 Living Tao: Still visions and dancing brushes(1976)
 Quantum Soup: A Philosophical Entertainment (1983)
 Thinking Body, Dancing Mind: Taosports for Extraordinary Performance in Athletics, Business, and Life with Jerry Lynch (1994)
 Beginner's Tai Ji Book (1995)
 Mentoring: The Tao of Giving and Receiving Wisdom with Jerry Lynch (1995)
 Chuang Tsu: Inner Chapters with Gia-Fu Feng (1997)
 Working Out, Working Within with Jerry Lynch a (1998)
 The Chinese Book of Animal Powers(1999)
 Tao Mentoring: Cultivate Collaborative Relationships in All Areas of Your Life with Jerry Lynch, and Laura Archera Huxley (1999)
 The Sage's Tao Te Ching: Ancient Advice for the Second Half of Life with William Martin, Hank Tusinski(2000)
 Essential Tai Ji (2004)
 The Way of the Champion: Lessons from Sun Tzu's The art of War and other Tao Wisdom for Sports & life with Jerry Lynch Ph.D. (2006)
 My Journey in Mystic China: Old Pu's Travel Diary by John Blofeld, with Daniel Reid, and Chungliang Al Huang (2008)
 The Spirit of Dancing Warriors with Jerry Lynch Ph.D (2010)
 Coaching With Heart: Taoist Wisdom to Inspire, Empower, and Lead with Jerry Lynch Ph.D (2013)

Music publications
 The Tao of Poetry with David Darling (2007)
 The Zen of Poetry with David Darling and guest narration by Ram Dass (2009)

References

External links
Bridging Heaven & Earth Show #132 – Interview with Chungliang Al Huang
The Great Lesson – The Great Lesson: A New Film About Mind and Body: Featuring Chungliang Al Huang
Living Tao Foundation
Biographical notes

1937 births
Chinese male dancers
Republic of China philosophers
Living people
Taiwanese philosophers
Philosophers from Shanghai
Chinese Civil War refugees
Taiwanese people from Shanghai